Seyrantepe can refer to:

 Seyrantepe Dam
 Seyrantepe (Istanbul Metro)
 Seyrantepe, Ahlat, a village
 Seyrantepe, Kozluk, a village